Summit Lake Creek is a tributary of Leggetts Creek in Lackawanna County, Pennsylvania, in the United States. It is a Trout Stocked Fishery and a Migratory Fishery. Reaches of the creek are considered to be impaired. There are a number of lakes and reservoirs in the watershed. The creek has one unnamed tributary, which is known as Unt 28530.

Course
Summit Lake Creek begins in a valley in Newton Townhship. It flows east-northeast for several tenths of a mile, passing through the Interlaken Lake, entering South Abington Township, and crossing Pennsylvania Route 307 before turning southeast and crossing Interstate 476. The creek then turns east for several tenths of a mile and passes through Maple Lake before turning east-northeast for several tenths of a mile.

Tributaries
Summit Lake Creek has no named tributaries. However, it has an unnamed tributary, which is known as "Unt 28530".

Hydrology
A reach of Summit Lake Creek is considered to be impaired by sedimentation/siltation and temperature. The probable sources of the impairment are infrastructure and upstream impoundments. Another reach of the creek is considered to be impaired by water/flow variability. The probable source of the impairment is urban runoff/storm sewers. The unnamed tributary Unt 28530 is also impaired.

Geography and geology

Lakes such as Maple Lake and Summit Lake are in the watershed of Summit Lake Creek. Maple Lake is an artificial 2.4-acre reservoir with a capacity of 4,000,000 gallons. Summit Lake is an originally natural 57-acre lake with a capacity of 259,000,000 gallons.

Watershed
The creek is entirely within the United States Geological Survey quadrangle of Scranton.

The upper reaches of Summit Lake Creek are on undisturbed land. However, the lower reaches of the creek flow through developed land. The borough of Clarks Summit has a permit to discharge stormwater into the creek.

The designated use of Summit Lake Creek is aquatic life.

History
Summit Lake Creek was entered into the Geographic Names Information System on August 2, 1979. Its identifier in the Geographic Names Information System is 1199652.

A concrete slab bridge carrying State Route 4032 over Summit Lake Creek was built in South Abington Township in 1904. A concrete tee beam bridge carrying US Route 11 over the creek was constructed in 1936.

The Maple Lake Dam was constructed on Summit Lake Creek in the 1800s. However, it was removed in December 2006. In 2011, Pennsylvania American Water, awarded a $2500 grant to the Clarks Summit Shade Tree Commission to reforest the area at the mouth of the creek and to clean up its streambed to avert potential flash flooding problems.

Biology
The entire drainage basin of Summit Lake Creek is a Trout-Stocked Fishery and a Migratory Fishery.

See also
Clover Hill Creek, next tributary of Leggetts Creek going downstream
List of rivers of Pennsylvania
List of tributaries of the Lackawanna River

References

Rivers of Lackawanna County, Pennsylvania
Tributaries of the Lackawanna River
Rivers of Pennsylvania